The John Ericsson-class monitors were a group of five iron-hulled monitors; four were built for the Royal Swedish Navy and one for the Royal Norwegian Navy in the mid to late 1860s. They were designed under the supervision of the Swedish-born inventor, John Ericsson, and built in Sweden. Generally the monitors were kept in reserve for the majority of the year and were only commissioned for several during the year. The ships made one foreign visit to Russia (visits to Norway did not count as foreign as that country was in a personal union with Sweden) in 1867, but remained in Swedish or Norwegian waters for the rest of their careers. Two of the monitors, Thordon and Mjølner, ran aground, but were salvaged and repaired. Most of the monitors were reconstructed between 1892 and 1905 with more modern guns, but one was scrapped instead as it was not thought cost-effective to rebuild such an old ship. The surviving ships were mobilized during World War I and sold for scrap afterwards.

Design and description
The John Ericsson-class ironclads were designed to meet the need of the Swedish and Norwegian Navies for small, shallow-draft armored ships capable of defending their coastal waters. A parliamentary committee set up earlier to investigate the state of the Swedish navy had already concluded that the existing fleet was obsolete and new construction would have to be steam-powered and built of iron. John Ericsson, designer and builder of the Monitor, had been born in Sweden, although he had become an American citizen in 1848, and offered to share his design with the Swedes. In response they sent Lieutenant John Christian d'Ailly to the United States to study monitor design and construction under Ericsson. D'Ailly arrived in July 1862 and toured rolling mills, gun foundries, and visited several different ironclads under construction. He returned to Sweden in 1863 having completed the drawings of a Monitor-type ship under Ericsson's supervision.

The ships were divided into nine main compartments by eight watertight bulkheads. Over time a flying bridge and, later, a full superstructure, was added to each ship between the gun turret and the funnel. Initially their crew numbered 80 officers and men, but this increased to 104 as the ships were modified with additional weapons.

Loke, the last-built ship in the class, was somewhat larger than her half-sisters. The ship drew  and displaced  fully loaded.

Propulsion
The John Ericsson-class ships had one twin-cylinder vibrating lever steam engines, designed by Ericsson himself, driving a single four-bladed,  propeller. The ships carried  of coal, enough for six day's steaming.

Armament
The lead ship, John Ericsson, carried a pair of smoothbore  Dahlgren muzzleloaders, donated by John Ericsson, in her turret. The massive shells took 5–6 minutes to reload. These guns were designated as the M/65 by the Swedes, but they were not satisfied with their performance and replaced them with other guns in the later ships.

Thordön and Tirfing were briefly armed with a pair of  M/66 smoothbore guns before being rearmed in 1872–73 with two  M/69 rifled breech loaders, derived from a French design. Loke, being the last ship delivered, was equipped with these guns while building. An improved version was developed in the 1870s and John Ericsson was fitted with them when she was overhauled in 1881. The other monitors gradually received their guns: Thordön in 1882, Tirfing in 1885 and Loke in 1890.

In 1877 each monitor received a pair of 10-barreled  M/75 machine guns designed by Helge Palmcrantz. These guns were replaced during the 1880s by the 4-barreled  M/77 Nordenfeldt gun, which was an enlarged version of Palmcrantz's original design.

Armor
The gun turret's armor consisted of twelve layers of iron, totaling  in thickness on the first four monitors. The inside of the turret was lined with mattresses to catch splinters. The conning tower was positioned on top of the turret and its sides were ten layers thick. The funnel was protected by six layers of armor with a total thickness of  up to half its height.

Construction

Service
These were the only foreign visits ever made by the three Swedish monitors.

Generally the monitors were kept in reserve for the majority of the year; only being commissioned for two to four months during the summer and fall. John Ericsson, named for the inventor, kept up the pattern between 1865 and 1873, but remained in reserve afterward until 1882. She was rearmed with the 240-millimeter M/76 guns in 1881 and her original Dahlgren guns became part of the Ericsson monument at Filipstad. The ship was reactivated in 1882 and 1883, but only sporadically thereafter. John Ericsson was reconstructed between 1892 and 1895; her gun turret was fixed in place and modified to serve as a barbette for her two new  Bofors M/89 guns. The guns could depress to −5° and elevate to +13°, and they had a firing arc of 290°. Two  Nordenfeldt M/92 quick-firing guns were also added on the superstructure. During the early 1900s the two 25-millimeter machine guns were removed and four, later six, more 57-millimeter guns added to the superstructure. The ship was assigned to the Karlskrona local defense force during 1913–18, and she was sold to the Gotland Cement Company in November 1919. The company converted her to a barge and used her for the next forty years; her final fate is unknown.

Thordön (later spelled Tordön) was laid up in reserve in 1868 and 1869. She was rearmed with 240-millimeter M/69 guns (serial numbers 5 and 6) in 1872, but was laid up again from 1874 to 1882. The ship ran aground and sank on Lilla Rimö Island, off Norrköping, on 23 July 1883. She was salvaged on 4 August and managed to proceed under her own power to Karlskrona Naval Dockyard for repairs. The subsequent court-martial ordered the ship's captain to pay for the costs of the salvage and repairs, despite a misplaced buoy that caused the ship to ground. She was recommissioned in 1885 and 1888–89 before being placed back in reserve. Tordön was reconstructed in 1903–05; she received a pair of new  Bofors M/94 guns that were given elevation limits of −7° and +15°. The ship also received eight 57-millimeter guns and new boilers. She was reactivated during World War I and assigned to the Göteborg local defense flotilla. Thordön was decommissioned in 1922 and sold the following year. Her new owner converted her into a barge and used her in Stockholm harbor.

Tirfing was commissioned less often than the first two monitors. She was only active in 1867, 1873, 1880, 1885 and 1888–89 before she was mobilized for World War I. Tirfing received her 240-millimeter M/69 guns in 1873. Tirfing joined her sister Thordön as part of the Göteborg flotilla during World War I and shared her fate.

Loke made only seven cruises before she was finally placed in reserve in late 1880. Funds were requested to rebuild her in 1903 and 1908, but they were refused. She was decommissioned on 21 August 1908 and advertised for sale. The details of her fate are unknown, but presumably she was sold and scrapped.

The Norwegians had built one monitor-type ship of their own, in 1865, and laid down several others, but the Norwegian Parliament authorized construction of Mjølner in 1867 in Sweden at the cost of 1,102,000 Norwegian krone. She was armed with a pair of steel  Armstrong rifled muzzle-loading guns in her turret as well as a  gun. The ship ran aground in 1869, but was only lightly damaged. She was visited by King Charles XV of Sweden on one occasion when visiting one of Sweden's west-coast ports in the early 1870s. Mjølner was reconstructed in 1897: her turret was converted to a barbette and her main guns were replaced by a pair of Cockerill 120-millimeter quick-firing guns. In addition two  and two  Cockerill guns were mounted in her superstructure as well as two 37-millimeter Hotchkiss 5-barrel revolving guns. Mjølner spent most of her career in Oslo Fjord and was scrapped in 1909.

See also 
 List of ironclads

Notes

Footnotes

References
 
 
 
 
 
 

 
Ships built in Norrköping